The following highways are numbered 561:

Canada

India
 National Highway 561 (India)

United States